Wrightia lecomtei is a species of plant in the family Apocynaceae. It is found in Cambodia and Thailand in dry and evergreen forests. It is a shrub to small tree and can grow up to 5 m tall. Most plant parts are puberulent. Leaves are arranged oppositely along the stem; each leaf is 3 - 8 cm long by 2- 3.5 cm wide, oval to ovate shaped.

References

lecomtei
Vulnerable plants
Taxonomy articles created by Polbot